The 1906 Northern Illinois State Normal football team represented Northern Illinois State Normal College as an independent in the 1906 college football season. They were led by first-year head coach Nelson A. Kellogg and played their home games at Glidden Field, located on the east end of campus. The team finished the season with a 4–2–1 record. Warren Madden was the team's captain.

Schedule

References

Northern Illinois State
Northern Illinois Huskies football seasons
Northern Illinois State Normal football